Dirphiella is a genus of moths in the family Saturniidae first described by Charles Duncan Michener in 1949.

Species
Dirphiella albofasciata (Johnson & Michener, 1948)
Dirphiella niobe (Lemaire, 1978)
Dirphiella taylori (Donahue & Lemaire, 1975)

References

Hemileucinae